Stjepan Veselic (born October 24, 1974 in Rotterdam, Netherlands) is a retired Dutch middleweight Muay Thai kickboxer. He is a former World and European champion in Muay Thai. Veselic had a tendency to go head-to-head with his opponents, which made him a favorite with fight fans.

Biography and career
Born of mixed Croatian-Dutch descent, Veselic started kickboxing at the age of 16. He fought out of Rotterdam for Pattaya Gym. His trainer was Ruud de Ronde alongside Herman Van Den Berge, Peter Mul, Ronald Wismeyer and Elroy Hage. Veselic is passionate fan of football club Feyenoord and during his career he fought in the Feyenoord colours and with the initials of Sporting Club Feyenoord 1908 on his short. He retired as a former WPKL Muay Thai Dutch, European and World Champion.

Titles
 2000 World Professional Kickboxing League (WPKL) Muay Thai World Middleweight Champion (3 title defenses)
 2000 WPKL Muay Thai European Middleweight Champion
 2000 WPKL Muay Thai Dutch Middleweight Champion
 1998 WPKL Muay Thai Dutch Super Welterweight Champion (1 title defense)
 1996 NKBB Kickboxing Dutch Super Welterweight Champion

Kickboxing record

|-  style="background:#cfc;"
| 2005-10-05 || Win ||align=left| Chiba || The Last Performance  || Rotterdam, Netherlands || KO || 1 || || 38-14
|-  style="background:#cfc;"
| 2005-04-03 || Win ||align=left| Mot Eck Muangsemaa || A Tribute to Leo de Snoo || Rotterdam, Netherlands || TKO ||  || || 37-14
|-  style="background:#fbb;"
| 2004-05-20 || Loss ||align=left| Gago Drago || It's Showtime 2004 Amsterdam || Netherlands || Decision (Unanimous) || 5 || 3:00 || 36-14 
|-  style="background:#fbb;"
| 2004-03-21 || Loss ||align=left| Pajonsuk || Veselic vs. Lumpini's No. 1 || Rotterdam, Netherlands || KO (Elbows) || 3 || || 36-13
|-
! style=background:white colspan=9 |
|-  style="background:#cfc;"
| 2003-10-05 || Win ||align=left| Laurant Piriqet || Night of Explosions || Rotterdam, Netherlands || KO ||  || || 36-12
|-  style="background:#fbb;"
| 2003-04-06 || Loss ||align=left| Gago Drago || K-1 World Grand Prix 2003 Preliminary Holland || Netherlands || KO (Right Knee Strike) || 3 || 2:40 || 35-12
|-  style="background:#cfc;"
| 2003-02-16 || Win ||align=left| Sakmongkol Sithchuchok ||  || Rotterdam, Netherlands || TKO (Corner Stoppage) || 2 ||  || 35-11
|-
! style=background:white colspan=9 |
|-  style="background:#cfc;"
| 2002-10-13 || Win ||align=left| Vincent Vielvoye || 2H2H 5: Simply the Best || Rotterdam, Netherlands || KO || 4 ||  || 34-11
|-
! style=background:white colspan=9 |
|-  style="background:#cfc;"
| 2002-09-08 || Win ||align=left| Eddy Saban || || Rotterdam, Netherlands || KO ||  ||  || 33-11
|-  style="background:#fbb;"
| 2002-04-21 || Loss ||align=left| Najim Ettouhlali || Victory or Hell || Amsterdam, Netherlands || KO ||  ||  || 32-11
|-  style="background:#fbb;"
| 2002-02-03 || Loss ||align=left| Rayen Simson ||  || Rotterdam, Netherlands || Decision (Unanimous) || 5 || 3:00 || 32-10
|-  style="background:#cfc;"
| 2001-04-29 || Win ||align=left| Sergei Karpin ||  || Rotterdam, Netherlands || TKO (Doctor Stoppage) || 1 ||  || 32-9
|-
! style=background:white colspan=9 |
|-  style="background:#fbb;"
| 2001-03-03 || Loss ||align=left| Jomhod Kiatadisak || The Night of Explosion || Rotterdam, Netherlands || Decision || 5 || 3:00 || 31-9
|-  style="background:#fbb;"
| 2000-12-12 || Loss ||align=left| Sergei Karpin || It's Showtime || Haarlem, Netherlands || KO || 1 ||  || 31-8
|-  style="background:#cfc;"
| 2000-11-12 || Win ||align=left| Andreas Marchetti || The Night of Explosion || Rotterdam, Netherlands || KO || 3 ||  || 31-7
|-  style="background:#cfc;"
| 2000-09-03 || Win ||align=left| Dejpitak Sityodtong || Veselic meets Dejpitak || Rotterdam, Netherlands || KO ||  ||  || 30-7
|-
! style=background:white colspan=9 |
|-  style="background:#cfc;"
| 2000-06-04 || Win ||align=left| Andy Souwer || Night of Revenge || Amsterdam, Netherlands || KO || 1 ||  || 29-7
|-  style="background:#cfc;"
| 2000-04-16 || Win ||align=left| Hassan Ettaki || Thrill of the Year || Rotterdam, Netherlands || KO || 1 ||   || 28-7
|-
! style=background:white colspan=9 |
|-  style="background:#cfc;"
| 2000-01-23 || Win ||align=left| Vincent Vielvoye || Day of No Mercy || Rotterdam, Netherlands || KO || 3 ||   || 27-7
|-
! style=background:white colspan=9 |
|-  style="background:#fbb;"
| 1999-12-05 || Loss ||align=left| Yodsuriyan Sith Yodthong || King's Birthday 1999 || Bangkok, Thailand || KO || 1 ||  || 26-7
|-  style="background:#cfc;"
| 1999-10-30 || Win ||align=left| Gerold Mamadeus || Night of Sensation || Rotterdam, Netherlands || KO || 2 ||   || 26-6
|-  style="background:#cfc;"
| 1999-09-25 || Win ||align=left| Rachid Biner || || Vlaardingen, Netherlands || KO ||  ||   || 25-6
|-  style="background:#cfc;"
| 1999-02-07 || Win ||align=left| Abdel Terzati || Matter of Honour   || Rotterdam, Netherlands || Decision (Unanimous) || 5 || 3:00  || 24-6
|-
! style=background:white colspan=9 |
|-  style="background:#cfc;"
| 1998-12-03 || Win ||align=left| Abdel Terzati || Night of Superstars || Amsterdam, Netherlands || DQ (Illegal Blow) ||  ||  || 23-6
|-
! style=background:white colspan=9 |
|-  style="background:#cfc;"
| 1998-11-28 || Win ||align=left| El Azzouz || || Rotterdam, Netherlands || KO ||  ||  || 22-6
|-  style="background:#fbb;"
| 1998-05-23 || Loss ||align=left| Rayen Simson || Muay Thai Champions League || Roosendaal, Netherlands || KO || 1 ||  || 21-6
|-  style="background:#cfc;"
| 1998-05-23 || Win ||align=left| Mangonjuk || Muay Thai Champions League || Roosendaal, Netherlands || KO || 3 ||  || 21-5
|-  style="background:#cfc;"
| 1997-12-13 || Win ||align=left| Yucel Fidan ||  || Den Bosch, Netherlands || Decision (Unanimous) || 5 || 3:00  || 20-5
|-  style="background:#cfc;"
| 1997-11-02 || Win ||align=left| Dave Delville ||  || Rotterdam, Netherlands || KO ||  ||  || 19-5
|-  style="background:#cfc;"
| 1997-06-01 || Win ||align=left| Arnold Sas || Battle of Amsterdam || Amsterdam, Netherlands || Decision (Unanimous) || 5 || 3:00  || 18-5
|-  style="background:#fbb;"
| 1997-04-? || Loss ||align=left| Najim Ettouhlali ||  || Amsterdam, Netherlands || KO ||  ||  || 17-5
|-  style="background:#fbb;"
| 1997-02-01 || Loss ||align=left| Hassan Ettaki ||  || Rabat, Morocco || KO ||  ||  || 17-4
|-  style="background:#fbb;"
| 1996-09-10 || Loss ||align=left| Dmitriy Pyasetsky ||  || Prague, Czech Republic || KO ||  ||  || 17-3
|-
! style=background:white colspan=9 |
|-  style="background:#cfc;"
| 1996-05-18 || Win ||align=left| Marvin Irion ||  || Emmen, Netherlands || KO || 2 ||  || 17-2
|-  style="background:#cfc;"
| 1996-02-04 || Win ||align=left| Robbie Nelson || || Dordrecht, Netherlands || TKO || 2 ||  || 16-2
|-
! style=background:white colspan=9 |
|-  style="background:#cfc;"
| 1995-11-14 || Win ||align=left| Rogier van der Heijden || Zilvermeeuwen || Zaandam, Netherlands || Decision (Unanimous) || 5 || 3:00 || 15-2
|-  style="background:#cfc;"
| 1995-06-18 || Win ||align=left| Nadir LaReche ||  || Breda, Netherlands || TKO || 1 ||    || 14-2
|-  style="background:#cfc;"
| 1995-05-08 || Win ||align=left| Aad Aldus ||  || Rotterdam, Netherlands || KO || 2 ||    || 13-2
|-  style="background:#cfc;"
| 1995-02-06 || Win ||align=left| Jimmy Hoover ||  || Rotterdam, Netherlands || Decision (Unanimous) || 5 || 2:00 || 12-2
|-  style="background:#cfc;"
| 1994-12-18 || Win ||align=left| Kaci ||  || Amsterdam, Netherlands || TKO ||  ||   || 11-2
|-  style="background:#cfc;"
| 1994-10-10 || Win ||align=left| Santjoe ||  || Rotterdam, Netherlands || KO || 1 ||   || 10-2
|-  style="background:#cfc;"
| 1994-06-27 || Win ||align=left| Mehmet Coban ||  || Rotterdam, Netherlands || KO || 1 ||   || 9-2
|-  style="background:#cfc;"
| 1994-05-16 || Win ||align=left| Damink ||  || Rotterdam, Netherlands || KO || 1 || 0:01  || 8-2
|-  style="background:#cfc;"
| 1994-04-18 || Win ||align=left| Franssachio ||  || Germany || KO || 3 ||  || 7-2
|-  style="background:#cfc;"
| 1994-03-05 || Win ||align=left| Don Kempers ||  || Breda, Netherlands || TKO (Referee Stoppage) || 3 ||  || 6-2
|-  style="background:#cfc;"
| 1993-11-27 || Win ||align=left| Bernard Veenstra ||  || Marum, Netherlands || KO || 1 ||  || 5-2
|-  style="background:#fbb;"
| 1993-05-16 || Loss ||align=left| El Ejjouri ||  || Sliedrecht, Netherlands || TKO (Corner Stoppage) ||  ||  || 4-2
|-  style="background:#fbb;"
| 1996-09-10 || Loss ||align=left| Renato Haseth ||  || Groningen, Netherlands || Decision (Unanimous) ||  ||  || 4-1
|-  style="background:#cfc;"
| 1993-01-23 || Win ||align=left| van de Berg ||  || Amsterdam, Netherlands || KO || 1 || 0:15 || 4-0
|-  style="background:#cfc;"
| 1992-12-14 || Win ||align=left| Wokke ||  || Rotterdam, Netherlands || Decision (Unanimous)  ||  ||  || 3-0
|-  style="background:#cfc;"
| 1992-06-14 || Win ||align=left| Kemmeren ||  || Breda, Netherlands || Decision (Unanimous) ||  ||  || 2-0
|-  style="background:#cfc;"
| 1992-04-10 || Win ||align=left| Ozden ||  || Germany || KO || 1 || 0:25 || 1-0
|-
| colspan=9 | Legend:

See also
 List of K-1 events
 List of male kickboxers

References

1974 births
Living people
Dutch male kickboxers
Middleweight kickboxers
Dutch Muay Thai practitioners
Sportspeople from Rotterdam